The 1927 Chicago aldermanic election happened on February 22 to elect the 50 aldermen of the Chicago City Council, on the same day as the primary elections for the mayoral election. Candidates ran as nonpartisans, and if no candidate received a majority of votes in a given ward the top two candidates in that ward faced off in a runoff election on April 5, the same day as the general mayoral election.

All told, despite the nonpartisan nature of the elections, Democrats won 31 of the seats while Republicans won 19. 10 wards necessitated runoff elections, of which Democrats won 6 and Republicans 4. 13 aldermen—11 Democrats and two Republicans—were returned without opposition.

References

Chicago City Council elections

1927 United States local elections